"More Than You Know" is the first single released from Martika's eponymous debut album. "More Than You Know" debuted on the Billboard Hot 100 on the chart dated December 24, 1988, and peaked at #18.  The single was re-released in Europe and Australasia in January 1990, and reached the top 40 in the UK (#15), Ireland, and Australia.

Formats
UK 12"
"More Than You Know" (Dance Mix Part I) – 6:10
"More Than You Know" (Dub Mix Part II) – 2:06
"More Than You Know" (House Mix Part I) – 6:06
"More Than You Know" (House Mix Part II) – 5:04

UK 7"
"More Than You Know" (7" remix) – 4:04
"More Than You Know" (Spanish version)

UK 7" version 2
"More Than You Know" (single version)
"Alibis" (backing track)

Japan 7"
"More Than You Know" (single version)
"Alibis"

Austria 3" CD
"More Than You Know" (dance mix) – 6:10
"Toy Soldiers" (Spanish version, "Como Un Juguete") – 4:44
"More Than You Know" (Spanish version, "Quiero Entregarte Mi Amor") – 4:12

Charts

References

Martika songs
1988 singles
1990 singles
Columbia Records singles
Songs written by Marvin Morrow
Songs written by Michael Margules
1988 songs
Songs written by Martika